Gavin Cowan (born 18 January 1987) is an Australian former professional rugby league footballer who played in the 2000s.

Background
Gavin Cowan was born in Australia, he has Scottish ancestors, and eligible to play for Scotland due to the grandparent rule.

Playing career
Cowan is a Scotland international player. He was named in the Scotland squad for the 2008 Rugby League World Cup. At the time, he was contracted to the Wests Tigers in Australia.

References

External links
(archived by web.archive.org) RLWC08 profile
(archived by web.archive.org) Scotland profile

1987 births
Australian people of Scottish descent
Living people
Rugby league centres
Rugby league fullbacks
Rugby league wingers
Scotland national rugby league team players